Mohammad Mottahedan 
is a collector and consultant in contemporary International Art, as well as a figure in the contemporary Iranian art scene, as a panelist and judge for art competitions, such as Magic of Persia.  He is currently based in London.

Biography

Born in Iran, he studied French in Paris before moving in the early 1980s to the United States to study Fine Art.
Mottahedan developed close relationships with a number of contemporary artists, and started to collect circa 1985. From here he continued to assemble a comprehensive collection of historically important works, including those of Jeff Koons, Peter Halley, Carroll Dunham, Christopher Wool, Cindy Sherman, Barbara Kruger, Albert Oehlen, Dana Schutz, Aaron curry, and Pietro Roccasalva. The collection, Once Upon a Time in America.

Mottahedan Projects

2011 has seen the launch of Mottahedan Projects, based in Dubai. Mottahedan Projects exhibited new and emerging international contemporary art, to gauge the visual artistic expressions across cultures and civilisations.  It was also dedicated to lead in developing, nurturing and creating platforms for emerging artists.

References 

Year of birth missing (living people)
Living people
Iranian art collectors